Pat et Stanley is an animated TV series that appeared as part of the children's television programme TFOU on the French network TF1. The show is animated by Mac Guff and created by Pierre Coffin, who would later on co-direct Despicable Me at the same studio via Illumination Entertainment.

Pat the brown hippopotamus and Stan the yellow dog have appeared in 39 short episodes as well as the 26-minute movie Pat et Stanley: Le Trésor de Pit et Mortimer (Pat and Stanley: The Treasure of Pit and Mortimer, 2006). Outside France, the duo are most famous for the short clip in which Pat is seen singing "The Lion Sleeps Tonight". The clip appeared in Italy in a commercial by Ferrero's Kinder chocolates; they also produced a "Happy Hippo" shaped chocolate snack.

Two English dubs have also been made, one broadcast on CITV and Pop in the United Kingdom, with Pat and Stan being voiced by Jay Simon and John Telfer respectively and another on Kids' WB (later known as The CW4Kids and then, Toonzai) and also The Shorts on Cartoon Network in the United States, where Pat and Stan were voiced by Dan Green and David Wills respectively and under two Dutch versions on Jetix in the Netherlands and on Ketnet in Flanders. Pat and Stanley are now featured in many unofficial online videos singing English (as well as international) songs. It was on Cartoon Network's website from December 5, 2014 to April 11, 2015.

Characters

Main 
 Pat (voiced by Dan Green) - a brown hippopotamus
 Stan (voiced by David Wills) - a yellow dog

Episodes

Season 1 
 Bath Time (Jour de bain)
 Cyber Stuart (Cyber Jean Luc)
 Mosquito Warning (Attention moustique)
 Wild Camping (Camping très sauvage)
 The Pool (La piscine)
 Artists (Pat et Stan artistes)
 My Friend Helmut (Mon ami Helmut)
 Super Loser (Super Blaireaux)
 The Death of Norbert (La disparition de Norbert)
 Pat Keeps the Rabbits (Pat, garde lapins)
 Double Pat (Double Pat)
 A Button on the Nose (Un bouton sur le nez)
 The Band Wagon (Tous en scène)

Season 2 
 The Gamma Zapper (La zapette gamma)
 Babysitters (Baby-sitter)
 Stuart Does Everything (Jean-Luc fait tout)
 Aunt Martha Moves (Tante Marthe s'installe)
 Roll With It (Roule ma poule)
 True False Bobo (Vrai faux bobo)
 Sting Recall (Piqûre de rappel)
 Stephanie Love (Stéphanie amoureuse)
 Micro Stan (Microstan)
 The Hamster of Bengal (Le hamster du Bengale)
 In Search of Lost Treasure (À la recherche du trésor perdu)
 Poles (Pat et Stan aux antipodes)
 Dig-o-mania (Creusomania)

Season 3 
 Stan Phone Home (Stan téléphone maison)
 Astro-Spountz (Le cosmospountz)
 One Night Dog (Une nuit de chien)
 The Return of Stuart (Le retour de Jean-Luc)
 Aunt Martha Comes to Dinner (Tante Marthe vient dîner)
 Pat's Pet (La bébête à Papat)
 Nasalation (Liaison nasale)
 A Short Break (Une petite pause)
 The Great Vacation (Les grandes vacances)
 Egg Surprise (Oeuf surprise)
 The Ghost of Aunt Party (Le fantôme de Mamy Madeleine)
 Scare Me If You Can (Fais moi peur)
 Grand Hotel (Grand hôtel)
 Charlie

References

External links
 Pierre Coffin. Retrieved on February 8, 2009. Creator's website.
 Mac Guff.  Paris, France: MacGuff Ligne.  Production company website.
 TFou.  Paris, France: TF1.  Retrieved on February 8, 2009.  Parent show's website (in French).

2000s French television miniseries
French children's animated comedy television series
Animated television series about dogs
Fictional hippopotamuses
French computer-animated television series
2004 French television series debuts
2010 French television series endings
2000s French animated television series
Television series by Entertainment One